"Nothingness" is a song by Living Colour and the third single off their third studio album, Stain. The ballad reached #17 on the Billboard Modern Rock Tracks chart in 1993.  It was later included on two greatest hits compilations, Pride (1995) and Everything Is Possible: The Very Best of Living Colour (2006). An acoustic version, allegedly intended for Dutch radio, was also included on 1994's Japan-exclusive Dread compilation.

This particularly moody track serves as a break from the more upbeat songs on the album. It opens with crickets chirping and a synthesizer-like guitar progression. A prominent bass rhythm carries the song and provides flashy funk-style fills. Lyrically, "Nothingness" delves into bleak themes of isolation and loneliness. Corey Glover's powerful voice is demonstrated toward the song's end as he wails its final chorus. The double-track effect of Glover's vocals were accomplished by having Glover sing directly into an outdoor satellite dish (with the microphone placed in the feedhorn location of the dish), hence the satellite-themed artwork of the single. The song, written by the group's drummer Will Calhoun, was in tribute to his father's passing.

Music video
The "Nothingness" video relies on brief clips of musical performance and atmosphere with no obvious story concept. It hosts dark, ambient background visuals such as clouds flowing across a piercing sun. Shots are brief and frequently fade to black with the band members seen in heavily shadowed or silhouetted form. As depicted on the CD single cover, satellite dishes are also seen in various settings.

Charts

References

External links
 "Nothingness" music video @ YouTube

Living Colour songs
1993 singles
1990s ballads
Heavy metal ballads
Hard rock ballads
Songs written by Will Calhoun
Experimental rock songs
1993 songs
Epic Records singles

Avant-garde metal songs